The Lawrence's miner bee (Andrena lawrencei) is a species of miner bee in the family Andrenidae. It is found in North America.

References

Further reading

 
 

lawrencei